The Woman I Love may refer to:

 The Woman I Love (1929 film), American film
 The Woman I Love (1937 film), American film
 "The Woman I Love" (song), song by Jason Mraz